Ramón Arturo Gutiérrez is an American historian.  He is the Preston & Sterling Morton Distinguished Service Professor in United States History and the college at the University of Chicago.

Life
He graduated from University of Wisconsin–Madison, with a Ph.D.
He taught at the University of California, San Diego from 1982 to 2007.
He also taught at the University of Chicago.

Awards
 1992 Frederick Jackson Turner Award from the American Historical Association
 1992 James A. Rawley Prize from the Organization of American Historians
 1983 MacArthur Fellows Program
 John Hope Franklin Prize from the American Studies Association

Works
"What's Love Got to Do with It?", Journal of American History, Vol.88, No.3, December 2001

Cuando Jesús llegó, las madres del maíz se fueron:  Matrimonio, sexualidad y poder en Nuevo México, 1500-1846 (México:  Fondo de la Cultura Económica, 1993).

Edited

 Ramón A. Gutiérrez; Geneviève Fabre, eds. (1995) Festivals and Celebrations in American Ethnic Communities. Albuquerque: University of New Mexico Press.

 Ramón A. Gutiérrez; Ernest Cook, eds. (1993). Encyclopedia of the North American Colonies. New York:  Charles Scribner's Sons.

Co-authored
Co-author, The Drama of Diversity and Democracy:  Higher Education and American Commitments (Washington, D.C.:  Association of American Colleges and Universities, 1995).
Co-author, American Pluralism and the College Curriculum:  Higher Education in a Diverse Democracy (Washington, D.C.:  Association of American Colleges and Universities, 1995).
Co-author, Liberal Learning and the Arts of Connection for the New Academy (Washington, D.C.:  Association of American Colleges and Universities, 1995).

References

External links
"Latino Genius: Ramon A. Gutierrez", the MacArturos Reunion in San Antonio, September 27, 2007

21st-century American historians
American male non-fiction writers
University of California, San Diego faculty
University of Chicago faculty
University of Wisconsin–Madison alumni
MacArthur Fellows
Year of birth missing (living people)
Living people
21st-century American male writers